Anjali Abrol is an Indian actress best known for her role in the Indian television series  Raja Ki Aayegi Baraat. Anjali participated in  Nach Baliye 4 with Kapil Nirmal in 2008. She made a debut in Bollywood with Singh Saab the Great in 2013.

Career 
Anjali grabbed her first role at the age of 15 in a 2008 Star Plus series Raja Ki Aayegi Baraat. She also acted in a Bollywood movie as Simar in Singh Saab the Great.

Television

Filmography 
 2013 Singh Saab the Great as Simar
 2019 Junction Varanasi as Anjali

References

External links
 

Living people
Indian television actresses
Indian soap opera actresses
1990s births
People from Jammu (city)
Actresses from Jammu and Kashmir
Year of birth missing (living people)